The Bronx Is Burning (stylized as The Bronx is Burning) is a television drama that debuted on ESPN on July 10, 2007, after the 2007 MLB Home Run Derby. It is an eight-episode mini-series adapted from Jonathan Mahler's best-selling book, Ladies and Gentlemen, the Bronx Is Burning. The book focuses on baseball's triumph over the turmoil and hysteria of 1977 New York City and how the New York Yankees came to embody the hopes and fears of an unforgettable summer with Billy Martin and Reggie Jackson's warfare under George Steinbrenner's leadership.

The show stars Daniel Sunjata, Oliver Platt, and John Turturro, while executive producers Mike Tollin, Brian Robbins, Joe Davola, writer and executive producer James Solomon, and director Jeremiah Chechik work on the show. The series is produced by ESPN Original Entertainment in conjunction with Tollin/Robbins Productions. Filming began on September 18, 2006, in Connecticut and New York. The 2007 debut of the series marked the 30th anniversary of the 1977 World Series win for the Yankees, the first under Steinbrenner. After airing on ESPN, the episodes were placed on ABC on Demand.

Summary
The central theme of the adaptation is the 1977 New York Yankees against the backdrop of New York City. Yankee superstar Reggie Jackson (Daniel Sunjata) and manager Billy Martin (John Turturro) are locked in a perpetual state of warfare. Jackson was a perfect foil for the scrappy Martin, a popular former Yankee player and reminder of the less complicated past of the team and the city. While owner George Steinbrenner (Oliver Platt) was an autocratic boss, he was also intent on keeping his promise to delivering a World Series title.

The show also features subplots concerning the New York City Police Department's pursuit of the Son of Sam serial killer that year and the blackout and resultant widespread looting in July, all while the city suffered through financial bankruptcy and massive municipal layoffs. Another subplot focused on the 1977 New York City mayoral election featuring incumbent mayor Abraham Beame, former U.S. Representative Bella Abzug, future Governor Mario Cuomo, and Congressman Ed Koch, the eventual winner.

The title refers to an off-the-cuff comment allegedly made by broadcaster Howard Cosell during the ABC telecast of Game Two of the 1977 World Series.

Episodes were filmed in New London, Waterford and Norwich in Connecticut as well as in New York City. New London stood in for New York City and Dodd Stadium in Norwich stood in for Yankee Stadium. The series' soundtrack consisted of songs by The Ramones.

Episodes
{| class="wikitable plainrowheaders" style="width: 100%; margin-right: 0;"
|-
! style="background:#1C2841; color:white;"| No.
! style="background:#1C2841; color:white;"| #
! style="background:#1C2841; color:white;"| Title
! style="background:#1C2841; color:white;"| Directed by
! style="background:#1C2841; color:white;"| Written by
! style="background:#1C2841; color:white;"| Original air date
|-

|}

Cast

 John Turturro, Yankees manager Billy Martin
 Daniel Sunjata, Yankees outfielder Reggie Jackson
 Oliver Platt, Yankees owner George Steinbrenner
 Kevin Conway, Yankees president Gabe Paul
 Daryl Blonder, Yankees batboy Ray Negron
 Rob Lavin, Yankees pitcher Ken Holtzman
 Erik Jensen, Yankees catcher Thurman Munson
 Loren Dean, Yankees back-up catcher Fran Healy
 Seth Gilliam, Yankees outfielder Paul Blair
 Joe Grifasi, Yankees bench coach Yogi Berra
 Mather Zickel, Yankees outfielder Lou Piniella
 Alex Cranmer, Yankees third baseman Graig Nettles
 Evan Hart, Yankees shortstop Bucky Dent
 Dock Pollard, Yankees second baseman Willie Randolph
 Lou Provenzano, Yankees pitcher Ron Guidry
 Darby Brown, Yankees designated hitter Cliff Johnson
 Jason Kosow, Yankees pitcher Catfish Hunter
 Max Casella, Yankees third base coach Dick Howser
 Leonard Robinson, Yankees outfielder Mickey Rivers
 Christopher McDonald, Yankees Hall of Famer Joe DiMaggio
 Tom Wiggin, Yankees Hall of Famer Whitey Ford
 Anthony Michael Hall, Yankees Hall of Famer Mickey Mantle
 Josh Pais, Reporter Phil Pepe
 Dan Lauria, Captain Joseph Borelli
 Nestor Serrano, Detective Kavanaugh
 Stephen Lang, Deputy Inspector Timothy Dowd
 John Mahoney, News Reporter (Background Casting)
 Casey Siemaszko, Detective Welker
 Josiah Schlatter, Clubhouse attendant
 Michael Rispoli, Newspaper columnist Jimmy Breslin
 Paul Marini, David Berkowitz
 Emily Wickersham, Suzy Steinbrenner
 Russell Woron-Simons, Student watching TV
 Jason Giambi, Taxi cab driver

References

External links 
 

ESPN original programming
2007 American television series debuts
2007 American television series endings
2000s sports films
Television shows based on non-fiction books
New York Yankees
Television series based on actual events
Television shows set in the Bronx
American sports television series
American baseball films
Baseball television series
Baseball on television in the United States
Films directed by Jeremiah S. Chechik
Television series set in the 1970s
English-language television shows
Cultural depictions of Joe DiMaggio
Cultural depictions of David Berkowitz
2000s American films